John Harvey was a Cornishman whose career started as a blacksmith and engineer at Carnhell Green near Hayle, in west Cornwall. In 1779 he established a foundry and engineering works at Hayle called Harvey & Co. By 1800 the company employed more than 50 people and continued to grow as Harvey worked with many of the great Cornish engineers and entrepreneurs of the day. These included Richard Trevithick, William West, and, more importantly, Arthur Woolf. In 1797, Harvey's daughter, Jane, married Richard Trevithick.

Harvey & Co. built up a reputation for world class stationary beam engines designed to pump water out of the deep Cornish tin and copper mines. The Cornish beam engine became world-famous and was exported overseas, and remains the largest type of beam engine ever constructed; the largest of all, with a  cylinder which powered eight separate beams, was used to drain the Haarlemmermeer in the Netherlands—it is preserved in the Museum De Cruquius.

The company was expanded by John's son, Henry, in collaboration with Arthur Woolf, who was the chief engineer. At that time it was the main mining engine foundry in the world, with an international market served through their own port at Foundry Town, Hayle.

Harvey's of Hayle reached their peak in the early- to mid-19th century and then, along with the Cornish mining industry in general, suffered a gradual and slow decline. Harvey's acquired the Cornish Copper Company in 1875. The engineering works and foundry were closed in 1903, although the company continued to trade as a general and builders merchant, eventually merging with UBM to become Harvey-UBM in 1969.

List of ships

See also

Mining in Cornwall and Devon
Hayle and Bristol Steam Packet Company

References

Edmund Vale The Harveys of Hayle. Truro: D. B. Barton, 1966

External links
Harvey's of Hayle

1730 births
Inventors from Cornwall
Engineers from Cornwall
People from Hayle
Year of death unknown
Year of birth unknown